Kallimoides is a monotypic genus of butterflies in the family Nymphalidae. It contains only one species, Kallimoides rumia, the African leaf butterfly. It is found in Guinea, Sierra Leone, Liberia, Ivory Coast, Ghana, Nigeria, Bioko, Cameroon, Gabon, the Republic of the Congo, Angola, the Central African Republic, the Democratic Republic of the Congo, Uganda, Rwanda, Burundi and Tanzania. The habitat consists of forests.

Adults are attracted to sucking-trees and sometimes also to fallen fruit and banana-baited traps.

The larvae feed on Brillantaisa species.

Subspecies
Kallimoides rumia rumia — Guinea, Sierra Leone, Liberia, Ivory Coast, Ghana
Kallimoides rumia jadyae (Fox, 1968) — Nigeria, Cameroon, Bioko, Gabon, Congo, Angola, Central African Republic, Democratic Republic of the Congo: Ubangi, Mongala, Uele, Ituri, Kivu, Tshopo, Tshuapa, Sankuru, Lualaba
Kallimoides rumia rattrayi (Sharpe, 1904) — Uganda, Rwanda, Burundi, north-western Tanzania

References

Nymphalinae
Monotypic butterfly genera